Shinpei or Shimpei (written: , , , , ,  or ) is a masculine Japanese given name. Notable people with the name include:

, Japanese politician
, Japanese cyclist
, Japanese footballer
, Japanese politician
, Japanese manga artist
, Japanese politician
, Japanese farmer
, Japanese songwriter
, Japanese linguist
, Japanese anthropologist 
, Japanese footballer
, Japanese actor 
, Japanese actor
Shimpei Takeda, Japanese photographer

Japanese masculine given names